Wartime Macau: Under the Japanese Shadow is a 2016 non-fiction book edited by Geoffrey C Gunn, published by Hong Kong University Press.

Gunn wrote more than half of the articles, and Peter Gordon wrote in a review published in Asian Review of Books that Wartime Macau has "more coherence of style and focus" compared to other books made up of essays written by multiple people.

References

Further reading
 

2016 non-fiction books
Books about Macau
History of Macau
Hong Kong University Press books